Nate Pyfer is an American record producer and songwriter/composer. Pyfer has collaborated with Kaskade and producer Finn Bjarnson on a number of projects including co-writing the Grammy nominated single "Atmosphere" on the eponymous album.

Nate Pyfer was a founding member of the bands Code Hero, Night Night, The Moth & The Flame, and his newest musical project Mr. Tape.  He also toured as a member of Joshua James' band during the late 2000s.

Remixes and collaborations released by Pyfer and his associates are most often under the pseudonyms "Mr. Tape" or "Wild Children". Notable Wild Children releases include "Catalyst" - Kaskade & Wild Children (Pyfer also sings on the track), "Crystallize Mashup (Wild Children Remix)" - Lindsey Stirling, and "Atmosphere (Wild Children x Neon Trees remix)" - Kaskade.

Production credits
"The Zell" - Mideau, 2017
"Faded Dream" - Goldmyth, 2017
"Obscene Dream" - Sego, 2016
"Minimalism" - VVE, 2016
"Young & Unafraid" – The Moth & The Flame, 2016
"Giant" – L'anarchiste, 2015
"TBA" – Mount Saint, 2014
"FICTIONIST" – Fictionist, 2014
"The New Tarot EP" - The New Tarot, 2014
"Parlor Hawk" – Parlor Hawk, 2014 
"Mideau" – Mideau, 2013
"Basic//Complex" – Polytype, 2012
"The Moth & The Flame"  – The Moth & The Flame, 2011
"I Am Now"  – ALARMs, 2011

Other credits
"Better Gone" (2013) – songwriting co-credit
"Atmosphere" (2013) – songwriting co-credit
"Every Bone" (2010) – mellotron, string arrangements, additional vocals

See also
Music of Utah

References

Living people
People from Provo, Utah
Record producers from Utah
Songwriters from Utah
Electronic music singers
American rock singers
American folk singers
American male singers
Year of birth missing (living people)
American male songwriters